{{DISPLAYTITLE:C4H3BrS}}
The molecular formula C4H3BrS (molar mass: 163.04 g/mol, exact mass: 161.9139 u) may refer to:

 2-Bromothiophene
 3-Bromothiophene

Molecular formulas